The first proposed USS Mira (SP-118) was a launch scheduled for United States Navy use as a patrol vessel in 1918 that was never commissioned.
 
Mira was built as a wooden-hulled civilian motor launch in 1911 by the Holmes Motor Company at West Mystic, Connecticut. The U.S. Navy acquired Mira from her owner, Charles L. Poor, and scheduled her for use as a patrol boat in the 3rd Naval District during World War I. However, she saw no active naval service, and the Navy returned her to Poor on 8 May 1918 without ever commissioning her.

References
 
 NavSource Online: Section Patrol Craft Photo Archive: Mira (SP 118)

Patrol vessels of the United States Navy
World War I patrol vessels of the United States
Cancelled ships of the United States Navy
Ships built in Mystic, Connecticut
1911 ships